Katy Industries, Inc. is a holding company for a group of businesses whose operations are divided between maintenance products and electrical products. The first manufactures and distributes commercial cleaning products, and sells consumer home and automotive storage products. The second designs and distributes consumer electrical-corded products.

The company was organized as a Delaware corporation in 1967, although some of its predecessor companies have been established for over 80 years. That includes its namesake, the Missouri–Kansas–Texas Railroad, a regional carrier which Katy Industries sold in 1988.

The founder of the holding company was industrialist Wallace E. Carroll. Members of the board of directors in 2013 were CEO David J. Feldman, Wallace E. Carroll, Jr., Daniel B. Carroll, and four members of private equity firm Kohlberg & Company: chairman William F. Andrews, Christopher W. Anderson, Samuel P. Freider, and Shant Mardirossian.

References 
Funding Universe Company Histories: Katy Industries Inc. History
Katy Industries Inc. annual report (2013)

External links 
 

Holding companies of the United States